Seila Law LLC v. Consumer Financial Protection Bureau, 591 U.S.  (2020) was a U.S. Supreme Court case which determined that the structure of the Consumer Financial Protection Bureau (CFPB), with a single director who could only be removed from office "for cause", violated the separation of powers. Handed down on June 29, 2020, the Court's 5–4 decision created a new test to determine when Congress may limit the power of the president of the United States to remove an officer of the United States from office.

The Court recognized that the president may generally remove officers at will. However, the Court stated there were two exceptions to this rule. First, the president's removal power may be constrained by Congress if the officer in question is a member of an agency that shares similar characteristics to the Federal Trade Commission as discussed in Humphrey's Executor v. United States (1935). Second, Congress may constrain the president's removal power over "inferior officers with limited duties and no policymaking" role as discussed in Morrison v. Olson (1988). The Court declined to extend the exceptions to "an independent agency led by a single director and vested with significant executive power."

The Court also held that the directorship position was severable from the statute that established the CFPB, allowing the CFPB to continue to operate.

Background 
The Consumer Financial Protection Bureau (CFPB) was envisioned by Elizabeth Warren while she was still a law professor at Harvard Law School. In 2010, it was established by the 2010 Dodd–Frank Wall Street Reform and Consumer Protection Act under President Barack Obama and the Democratic-led Congress. It was designed to protect consumers and promote regulations to prevent similar events such as the Great Recession that ran from 2007 to 2009. To be able to promote these regulations, it was determined that the agency needed to be independent, and thus Congress designed the agency to have a single director, selected by the president with confirmation by the Senate, appointed to a five-year term, and who could only be removed for "inefficiency, neglect of duty, or malfeasance in office." Since its establishment, the CFPB has actively gone after banks and other financial service providers that have been determined to be "bad actors". For instance, it fined Wells Fargo large sums of money due to the Wells Fargo account fraud scandal.

The CFPB had been seen as a bane by the Republican Party and as a sign of government overreach. In the years after it was established, Republicans gained control of the Senate, and Donald Trump became president in 2017, putting the CFPB under scrutiny. Businesses that also shared a dismissive view of the CFPB began to file lawsuits challenging the constitutionality of the CFPB's organizational structure. These lawsuits focused on the for-cause termination statute around the CFPB's directorship position. For-cause removal of agency executives presents a prima facie challenge to the separation of powers, because it places a limit—imposed by Congress—on the president's Article II authority over executive branch officials. Most courts that had considered the question found that for-cause removal of the CFPB director was constitutional. However, the Supreme Court's "precedents on for-cause removal [were] a jurisprudential train wreck."

An alert published by Holland & Knight noted that the litigation posture of Seila Law was unusual, as the CFPB declined to defend the constitutionality of its own structure before the Supreme Court.

Facts and procedural history 
Seila Law LLC (Seila Law), a law firm that provided debt relief services, was under investigation by the CFPB. As part of its investigation, the CFPB issued a civil investigative demand (CID) to Seila Law, which required Seila Law to produce certain documents. Seila Law declined to comply with the CID and challenged the constitutionality of the CFPB. Judge Josephine Staton of the United States District Court for the Central District of California found the CFPB to be constitutionally structured. 

On appeal at the Ninth Circuit, the circuit panel affirmed the district court's ruling, and agreed that the Supreme Court's prior decisions upholding for-cause removal in Humphrey's Executor and Morrison were "controlling." It also referred approvingly to the en banc decision of the DC Circuit in PHH Corp. v. CFPB (2018), in which the Circuit found that the structure of the CFPB was constitutional. The courts opinion arguably created a circuit split because while the Ninth Circuit and DC Circuit had held that the CFPB's structure to be constitutional, the Fifth Circuit in Collins v. Mnuchin (2018) held that the structure of the Federal Housing Finance Agency—an agency that had a director who was structurally similar to CFPB's—was not.

Supreme Court

Majority opinion 
The Supreme Court granted certiorari in Seila Law on October 18, 2019, and heard oral argument on March 3, 2020. The Court issued its decision on June 29, 2020. Chief Justice John Roberts wrote the opinion of the Court, joined by justices Clarence Thomas, Samuel Alito, Neil Gorsuch, and Brett Kavanaugh. The 5–4 decision ruled that the CFPB structure, with a sole director that could only be terminated for cause, was unconstitutional as it violated the separation of powers. Specifically, the Court held that Article II of the Constitution gives the president the power to remove principal officers at will except for two exceptions recognized under case law. The first exception was based on Humphrey's Executor v. United States. Roberts narrowly construed Humphrey's Executor to stand for the proposition that the president's removal power may be constrained by Congress if the officer in question was a member of an agency that shared the same characteristics as the Federal Trade Commission in 1935. In Humphrey's, the FTC was described as "exercising 'no part of the executive power'" and as "'an administrative body' that performed 'specified duties as a legislative or as a judicial aid." Because the CFPB was dissimilar from that description, the Court held that the exception did not apply. 

The second exception to the president's at-will removal power came from Morrison v. Olson which held that Congress could constrain the president's removal power over "inferior officers with limited duties and no policymaking" role. Because the CFPB director was not an inferior officer, the Court held that this exception did not apply. 

Having determined that the insulation of the CFPB director did not fall under an established exception, Chief Justice Roberts then looked to see whether the Court should "extend those precedents to ... an independent agency led by a single director and vested with significant executive power." He reasoned no. Roberts wrote that the CFPB structure with a single point of leadership that could only be removed for cause "ha[d] no foothold in history or tradition", and had only been used in four other instances: three modern uses for the United States Office of Special Counsel, the Social Security Administration, and the Federal Housing Finance Agency, and temporarily for one year during the American Civil War for the Office of the Comptroller of the Currency. Roberts wrote that the three current uses "are modern and contested. And they do not involve regulatory or enforcement authority comparable to that exercised by the CFPB." Roberts also wrote that the CFPB structure "is also incompatible with the structure of the Constitution, which—with the sole exception of the presidency—scrupulously avoids concentrating power in the hands of any single individual." In support of this position, Roberts also cited the decision of 1789. 

The Court also held that the statutes around the director of the CFPB was severable from the rest of the statute establishing the agency, and thus "[t]he agency may therefore continue to operate, but its director, in light of our decision, must be removable by the president at will." The Court vacated the lower court's judgement and remanded the case for review. The dissenting justices concurred on the matter of severability.

Concurrence and dissent 
Justice Thomas wrote a partial concurrence joined by Justice Gorsuch, adding that he believed that Humphrey's Executor should be overturned and all "for cause" terminations positions should be considered unconstitutional. Thomas also wrote that he believed there was no need to resolve the severability matter for the case at hand.

Justice Elena Kagan wrote a dissent joined by justices Ruth Bader Ginsburg, Stephen Breyer, and Sonia Sotomayor. The Kagan dissent struck a functionalist tone in contrast with the formalism apparent in the Court's opinion. Kagan challenged the argument presented by the majority stating that "[n]owhere does the text [of the Constitution] say anything about the president's power to remove subordinate officials at will." She also contested the majority's characterization of Article II's Take Care Clause as conferring power to the president. Kagan wrote that to the extent the clause gives the president any power—instead of merely conferring a duty upon them—it is only power to ensure that "the laws are faithfully executed." Kagan also challenged Roberts' characterization of the Decision of 1789, stating that "[t]he best view is that the First Congress 'was deeply divided' on the president's removal power, and 'never squarely addressed' the central issue here." Finally, she questioned why it was relevant that the head of the CFPB was an independent director and not an independent commission, as independent commissions theoretically cause a higher diffusion of executive power than a single director does.

Commentary and impact 
Seila Law has been the subject of numerous law review articles. Its use of precedent has perplexed legal scholars. Important questions raised by commentators post-Seila include:

 Whether Myers and Humphrey's Executor "still stand for the proposition that Congress can impose limitations on the president’s removal authority for agency heads as long as it does not retain a role for itself?"
 If Humphrey’s Executor and Morrison v. Olson are exceptions "to the view that Congress cannot impose limitations on the president’s removal authority, what is the scope of these exceptions?" 
 "Is there really a conceptually relevant difference between agencies with one head and those with multiple heads? Is the modern-day FTC now vulnerable?"

Professor Edward Cantu wrote that "[c]onsistent with how the Court has always approached separation-of-powers decisions, Seila should be viewed not as anti-pragmatic formalism but as pragmatic posturing." In contrast, Professor Lisa Schultz Bressman believed that Seila Law "offered a vision of separation of powers" that finally explained Chief Justice Roberts' administrative law jurisprudence. Further, she called the case's new removal test "remarkable both because it changes the law and because of how it changes the law: it lets the structure of the agency determine the degree of presidential control over its principal officers."

The majority opinion has also been written about as an example of a case based on the unitary executive theory. Thomas A. Barnico, a professor at Boston College Law School, noted that the case raised federalism issues. In particular, he suggested that the CFPB's power to pre-empt state legislation presented special concerns regarding accountability for its leadership.

Subsequent to the decision, the Supreme Court certified the petition to the Fifth Circuit decision on Collins v. Mnuchin related to the Federal Housing Finance Agency (FHFA) that had been established with the same single-administrator position, dismissable only for cause, as the CFPB. In June 2021, the Supreme Court affirmed the Fifth Circuit's decision in light of Seila Law that the FHFA directorship position's termination allowance was unconstitutional but otherwise left the FHFA in place.

See also 
 Consumer Financial Protection Bureau v. Community Financial Services Association of America, Limited

References

Sources 
  [Seila Law CA]

Notes

External links  
 

2020 in United States case law
United States Supreme Court cases
United States Supreme Court cases of the Roberts Court
Appointments Clause case law
United States separation of powers case law
Consumer Financial Protection Bureau